Agelena gonzalezi is a spider species found in the Canary Islands.

See also 
 List of Agelenidae species

References 

 

gonzalezi
Spiders of the Canary Islands
Spiders described in 1980